Brier Island is an island in the Bay of Fundy in Digby County, Nova Scotia.

Geography
The island is the westernmost part of Nova Scotia and the southern end of the North Mountain ridge with Long Island lying immediately northeast; both islands constitute part of the Digby Neck.

Brier Island is separated from Long Island by the  Grand Passage. Westport is the only village on the island. The population, as of 2016 was 218. There were 98 private dwellings occupied year round.

The island is an important stopover point for migrating sea birds.

The island's name is believed by some to come from the wild brier roses found there, another possibility is that the original name of the Island was "Bryer's" after a sea captain from New England who was one of the first settlers to spend any time on the island.

Economy
The local economy is driven by the year-round commercial fishing industry and the seasonal tourism industry, which is largely focused on whale watching tours.

The island is home to R. E. Robicheau Ltd, a general store with a gas pump, gift shop, and café. On the eastern side of the island is the one hotel, the Brier Island Lodge. There are also several bed and breakfasts, a used book store and gift shops.
The island contains the fishing village of Westport which is connected to Freeport on Long Island by a ferry operated by the provincial government.

Brier Island is frequently inundated by fog and has witnessed 57 recorded shipwrecks.  The island has "a lighthouse per mile" with the Northern and Western lighthouses on the island, as well as the Peter Island lighthouse in Grand Passage; all are automated and are operated by the Canadian Coast Guard. The wreck of the barque "Aurora" in 1908 provided the lumber for the Westport Community Hall.

The Canadian Coast Guard operates CCG Station Westport in the village.  The rescue cutter CCGC Westport provides 24-hour-per-day, 7 days per week response to search and rescue incidents within the eastern Gulf of Maine and the southern and eastern Bay of Fundy.

Public library
Westport Branch Library; Westport

Famous residents
Brier Island was the childhood home of sailor Joshua Slocum who became the first person to circumnavigate the world alone. A monument to Slocum and the bootshop where he worked as a boy can be seen in Westport.

Ecology
The endangered Eastern mountain avens is present on Brier Island.

See also
Volcanism of Eastern Canada

References

"Place Names of Nova Scotia" Nova Scotia Archives and Records Management website
"Brier Island" The Davis Family online family history

Islands of Nova Scotia
Landforms of Digby County, Nova Scotia
Volcanism of Nova Scotia